2016 in Indian sports describes the year's events in Indian sport. The main highlight for this year for India is the 2016 Olympic and Paralympic Games in Rio de Janeiro and the T20 World cup.

Calendar by month

January

February

March

April

August

September

Medalist at 2016 Rio Paralympics

October

November

December

| 23
| Cricket
| ACC Under-19 Cup
|India (273/8) led by captain Abhishek Sharma beat Sri Lanka (239/10) and won the cup

Year highlights

 India competed in 2016 Rio Olympics & Paralympics and bagged 2 and 4 medals respectively.
 Cricket T20 World cup held in India.
 Indian cricket team finished the year by holding the top ICC test Ranking. Remained unbeaten in 18 Test Matches.
 India won Hockey Junior World cup for second time.
 Domestic League season took place for Hockey, Cricket & Football.
 Indian football team achieved their top rank in past six years as they finished 135 in FIFA Ranking & jumped 31 spot in 2016.

References